Charles Easton Rothwell AKA Charles Rothwell and Charles E. Rothwell, (1902-1987) was a 20th-century, career American diplomat best known for co-writing the United Nations Charter and serving as Hoover Institution director and Mills College president.

Background
Charles Easton Rothwell was born on October 9, 1902, in Denver, Colorado.  In 1924, received an A.B. from Reed College in Portaland, Oregon.  In 1929, he obtained an A.M. from the University of Oregon.  In 1938, he obtained a doctorate from Stanford University.

Career
In 1927, Rothwell became director of teacher training in social sciences at the University of Oregon, where he served until 1935.  In 1932, he became an instructor of citizenship and history at Stanford University.

In 1939, he became an assistant professor at Reed College.

During World War II, Rothwell worked for the United States Department of State until 1946.  In 1945, he worked with Alger Hiss in the executive secretariat to the United Nations Conference on International Organization in San Francisco, California.  In 1946, he served on the US delegation to the United Nations, when he helped Abraham Feller and others write the UN Charter.  

In 1946, Rothwell was a senior staff member at the Brookings Institution.

In 1947, Rothwell became vice chairman and research professor at the Hoover Institution and Library through 1952, when he became Hoover Institution direction through 1959.

In 1951, Rothwell served as a staff member at the National War College.

In 1959, Rothwell became president of Mills College through 1967, when he retired and became a regional adviser to the Asia Foundation.

Personal life and death
In 1932, Rothwell married Virginia Sterling.  They had one child, a daughter.

Charles Easton Rothwell died age 84 on May 1, 1987.

Works
Books
 A Comparative Study of Elites with Harold D. Laswell and Daniel Lerner (1952)
 Contributed to The Policy Sciences, edited by Daniel Lerner and Harold D. Lasswell (1951)

Articles
 "War and Economics Institutes" with other contributors, War as a Social Institution (American Historical Association)
 "International Relations in a World of Change" with others, World Politics (1949)
 "International Organization and World Politics" with others, International Organization, Vol. III (1949)

References

External sources
 Register of the Charles Easton Rothwell papers

1902 births
1987 deaths
United States Department of State officials
Mills College people
Brookings Institution people
Hoover Institution people
United Nations officials